Francisco Sousa dos Santos, (born 27 July 1989) is a Brazilian footballer. Mainly a left back, he can also play as a midfielder or forward. He currently plays for Santa Cruz.

Club career
Born in Caxias, Maranhão, Chiquinho was spotted by Atlético Mineiro's youth setup in 2004, aged 15. He made his first team – and Série A – debut on 21 June 2009, starting in a 3–2 away win against Santos.

However, Chiquinho was rarely used by Galo, and subsequently served loan spells at Tupi, Ipatinga and Nova Iguaçu. He was released by Atlético in May, and immediately returned to Ipatinga.

On 21 August 2012 Chiquinho signed an 18-month deal with Corinthians. He was rarely used by the club, and moved to Ponte Preta on 13 December.

Chiquinho scored his first goal in the top division on 5 June 2013, netting the first in a 3–4 home loss against Atlético Paranaense. He was also a regular during Ponte's Copa Sudamericana run, scoring one goal in eight appearances.

On 10 January 2014 Chiquinho joined Fluminense, in a one-year deal. He was a regular starter during his spell, being mostly used as a left back and overtaking longtime incumbent Carlinhos.

On 8 January 2015 Chiquinho signed for Santos, after agreeing to a one-year contract. He made his debut for the club on 1 February, starting and scoring the second in a 3–0 home win against Ituano.

On 17 January 2017 Chiquinho signed for Shonan Bellmare.

Career statistics

Honours
Santos
Campeonato Paulista: 2015

References

External links
Fluminense official profile 

1989 births
Living people
Sportspeople from Maranhão
Brazilian footballers
Association football defenders
Association football midfielders
Association football utility players
Campeonato Brasileiro Série A players
Campeonato Brasileiro Série B players
Campeonato Brasileiro Série C players
Clube Atlético Mineiro players
Ipatinga Futebol Clube players
Nova Iguaçu Futebol Clube players
Sport Club Corinthians Paulista players
Associação Atlética Ponte Preta players
Fluminense FC players
Santos FC players
CR Flamengo footballers
Shonan Bellmare players
Oita Trinita players
Dibba FC players
J2 League players
Meizhou Hakka F.C. players
Esporte Clube Vitória players
China League One players
UAE First Division League players
Brazilian expatriate footballers
Expatriate footballers in Japan
Expatriate footballers in China
Brazilian expatriate sportspeople in China
Expatriate footballers in the United Arab Emirates
Brazilian expatriate sportspeople in the United Arab Emirates